Óbidos is a Portuguese wine region centered on the town of Óbidos in the Lisboa region. The region is designated as Denominação de Origem Controlada (DOC) after it was promoted from its former Indicação de Proveniencia Regulamentada (IPR) status in 2006.

The region produces both red and white wines with the white wines being traditionally used for distilled beverages.

Grapes
The principle grapes of the Óbidos region include Arinto, Bastardo, Camarate, Fernao Pires, Periquita, Rabo de Ovelha, Tinta Miuda and Vital.

See also
List of Portuguese wine regions

References

Wine regions of Portugal